Marion is a city in LaMoure County, North Dakota, United States. The population was 125 at the 2020 census.

History
The city was founded in 1900 as Elmo, but changed its name to Marion in 1902. The new name came from Marion Mellen, daughter of Northern Pacific Railway president Charles Sanger Mellen. Marion was located at the end of a Northern Pacific branch line starting in Casselton and known as the "lady line" due to the many cities bearing female names located alongside the tracks. The line was in place in Marion until 2002, when eventual owner Red River Valley & Western filed for abandonment.

Geography
Marion is located at  (46.607360, -98.333510).

Demographics

2010 census
As of the census of 2010, there were 133 people, 64 households, and 36 families residing in the city. The racial makeup of the city was 98.5% White and 1.5% from two or more races.

There were 64 households, of which 18.8% had children under the age of 18 living with them, 46.9% were married couples living together, 7.8% had a female householder with no husband present, 1.6% had a male householder with no wife present, and 43.8% were non-families. 37.5% of all households were made up of individuals, and 20.3% had someone living alone who was 65 years of age or older. The average household size was 2.08 and the average family size was 2.69.

The median age in the city was 50.3 years. 15% of residents were under the age of 18; 10.7% were between the ages of 18 and 24; 18.1% were from 25 to 44; 27.1% were from 45 to 64; and 29.3% were 65 years of age or older. The gender makeup of the city was 51.1% male and 48.9% female.

2000 census
As of the census of 2000, there were 146 people, 71 households, and 40 families residing in the city. The population density was 174.4 people per square mile (67.1/km2). There were 86 housing units at an average density of 102.8 per square mile (39.5/km2). The racial makeup of the city was 98.63% White, 0.68% Asian, and 0.68% from two or more races.

There were 71 households, out of which 21.1% had children under the age of 18 living with them, 49.3% were married couples living together, 5.6% had a female householder with no husband present, and 16.2% were non-families. 40.8% of all households were made up of individuals, and 22.5% had someone living alone who was 65 years of age or older. The average household size was 2.06 and the average family size was 2.80.

In the city, the population was spread out, with 20.5% under the age of 18, 4.8% from 18 to 24, 19.9% from 25 to 44, 26.0% from 45 to 64, and 28.8% who were 65 years of age or older. The median age was 49 years. For every 100 females, there were 97.3 males. For every 100 females age 18 and over, there were 96.6 males.

The median income for a household in the city was $21,250, and the median income for a family was $24,583. Males had a median income of $39,000 versus $34,000 for females. The per capita income for the city was $31,041. There were 10.4% of families and 22.8% of the population living below the poverty line, including 25.6% of under eighteens and 27.9% of those over 64.

Education
It is in the Litchville-Marion School District. The district was formed in 2002.

In passing
Marion was mentioned on the March 5, 2014 episode of "Wheel of Fortune". A former resident, Stephanie Limesand, appeared on the show.

References

External links
Marion 1900-1950 from the Digital Horizons website
Our community, Marion, N. Dak., 1900-1975 : prairie to present from the Digital Horizons website

Cities in North Dakota
Cities in LaMoure County, North Dakota
Populated places established in 1900
1900 establishments in North Dakota